A Big Deal is a 2011 Chinese adventure comedy film written and directed by Ma Liwen and starring Qiao Renliang, Lan Cheng-lung, Han Chae-young, and Chapman To. The film tells the story of three young people who went to Dubai for gold rush. The film premiered in China on 2 December 2011.

Cast
 Qiao Renliang as Liu Yijun
 Lan Cheng-lung as Zhang Ze
 Han Chae-young as Zhou Yun
 Chapman To as Wang Yunpeng
 Andy Hui as Yang Yi
 Huang Ling as Xiao Ai
 Tong Yao as Chen Shu
 Ying Zhuang as Sun Fan
 Ye Daying as President Huang
 Xia Fan
 Gong Xinliang 
 He Tiehong as Qian Duoduo
 Hu Shufang

Production
Most of the film was shot on location in Beijing, Seoul and Dubai.

Release
A Big Deal was released on December 2, 2011 in China.

Reception
Douban gave the drama 4.7 out of 10.

References

External links
 
 
 

2011 films
2010s Mandarin-language films
Chinese adventure comedy films
2010s adventure comedy films
Films set in Beijing
Films set in Seoul
Films set in Dubai
Films shot in Beijing
Films shot in Seoul
Films shot in Dubai
Films directed by Ma Liwen
2011 comedy films